Aptyxis is a genus of sea snails, marine gastropod mollusks in the family Fasciolariidae, the spindle snails, the tulip snails and their allies.

Species
Species within the genus Aptyxis include:
 Aptyxis syracusana (Linnaeus, 1758)
Species brought into synonymy
 Aptyxis luteopicta (Dall, 1877): synonym of Hesperaptyxis luteopictus (Dall, 1877)

References

 Russo P. (2016). On the grammatical gender of Aptyxis Troschel, 1884 (Gastropoda, Fasciolariidae). Bollettino Malacologico. 52: 76
 Russo P. (2015). On the systematic position of Murex syracusanus Linnaeus, 1758 (Gastropoda, Fasciolariidae) with revaluation of the genus Aptyxis. Bollettino Malacologico. 51(2): 79-86

External links
 Troschel, F. H. (1856-1893). Das Gebiss der Schnecken zur Begründung einer natürlichen Classification. Nicolaische Verlagsbuchhandlung, Berlin. Vol. 1: i-viii, 1-252 pls 1-20 [1856-63. Vol. 2: i-ix, 1-246, 247-409 [continued by Thiele, J.] pls 1- 32 [1866-1893] [for dates of publication, see Robertson, 1957: Nautilus 70(4)]

 
Fasciolariidae
Gastropod genera